1889 in sports describes the year's events in world sport.

Athletics
USA Outdoor Track and Field Championships

American football
College championship
 College football national championship – Princeton Tigers

Association football
Denmark
 Formation of the Danish Football Union (Dansk Boldspil-Union or DBU)
England
 The Football League – Preston North End 40 points, Aston Villa 29, Wolves 28, Blackburn Rovers 26, Bolton Wanderers 22, West Bromwich Albion 22
 FA Cup final – Preston North End 3–0 Wolverhampton Wanderers at The Oval.
 Preston North Ends wins the inaugural Football League championship unbeaten, an achievement that will not be equalled until 2003–04 by Arsenal.  Preston also wins the FA Cup to become the first team ever to complete The Double.  The team earns the nickname of "Invincibles".
 The Football Alliance is founded as a rival to the Football League.  It is short-lived and collapses in 1892 when the Football League expands.  The Alliance is brokered by Sheffield Wednesday president John Holmes.  Founder members include Sheffield Wednesday, Newton Heath (Manchester United), Nottingham Forest, Small Heath (Birmingham City) and Grimsby Town.  Ardwick (Manchester City) will join in 1891 for the final season.
 Sheffield United is founded.  With Sheffield Wednesday having left Bramall Lane in 1887, the management committee of the Bramall Lane complex decides to form a new football club at the ground, using Sheffield United Cricket Club as its basis.  Bramall Lane is the world's oldest professional football venue, though not the longest in continuous use (which is Deepdale).
 The 1889–90 Football League season features the same 12 teams as in 1888–89.
Netherlands
 8 December — formation of the Royal Dutch Football Association (i.e., the Koninklijke Nederlandse Voetbalbond or KNVB).
Scotland
 Scottish Cup final – Third Lanark 2–1 Celtic (replay; the SFA declared the original match void due to adverse conditions).  Celtic reaches the Scottish Cup final in the club's inaugural season.

Baseball
National championship
 National League v. American Association – New York Giants (NL) defeats Brooklyn Dodgers (AA) 6 games to 3.

Boxing
Events
 8 July — John L. Sullivan defeats Jake Kilrain after 75 rounds in the last major bareknuckle contest.  Some authorities recognise it as a world title contest although it is fought under London Prize Ring Rules rather than the now-accepted Queensberry Rules.
Lineal world champions
 World Heavyweight Championship – John L. Sullivan
 World Middleweight Championship – Jack Nonpareil Dempsey
 World Welterweight Championship – Paddy Duffy
 World Lightweight Championship – Jack McAuliffe

Cricket
Events
 12–13 March — South Africa plays its inaugural Test match against the touring England national cricket team. England wins by 8 wickets.  The match also marks the beginning of first-class cricket in South Africa where the Currie Cup is inaugurated as the premier domestic competition.
 The number of balls per over in England is increased from four to five.  The four-ball over has been used since time immemorial.
 The major English county cricket clubs meet to agree a way of deciding an order of ranking for the next season; the official County Championship is established.
England
 Champion County –  Surrey, Lancashire and Nottinghamshire share the title
 Most runs – W. G. Grace 1,396 @ 32.46 (HS 154)
 Most wickets – George Lohmann 202 @ 13.43 (BB 9–67)
 Wisden Nine Great Batsmen of the Year – Bobby Abel, Billy Barnes, Billy Gunn, Louis Hall, Robert Henderson, Maurice Read, Arthur Shrewsbury, Frank Sugg, Albert Ward 
Australia
 Most runs – Harry Trott 507 @ 39.00 (HS 172)
 Most wickets – John Ferris 36 @ 15.83 (BB 6–62)

Golf
Major tournaments
 British Open – Willie Park junior
Other tournaments
 British Amateur – Johnny Laidlay

Horse racing
England
 Grand National – Frigate
 1,000 Guineas Stakes – Minthe
 2,000 Guineas Stakes – Enthusiast
 The Derby – Donovan
 The Oaks – L'Abbesse de Jouarre
 St. Leger Stakes – Donovan
Australia
 Melbourne Cup – Bravo
Canada
 Queen's Plate – Colonist
Ireland
 Irish Grand National – The Citadel
 Irish Derby Stakes – Tragedy
USA
 Kentucky Derby – Spokane
 Preakness Stakes – Buddhist
 Belmont Stakes – Eric

Ice hockey
Events
 27 March — Montreal Hockey Club defeats Montreal Victorias 6–1 in the final challenge of the season to win the 1889 AHAC championship

Rowing
The Boat Race
 30 March — Cambridge wins the 46th Oxford and Cambridge Boat Race

Rugby football
Home Nations Championship
 The 7th series is won by Scotland following victories over both Ireland and Wales.

Tennis
England
 Wimbledon Men's Singles Championship – William Renshaw (GB) defeats Ernest Renshaw (GB) 6–4 6–1 3–6 6–0
 Wimbledon Women's Singles Championship – Blanche Bingley Hillyard (GB) defeats Lena Rice (GB) 4–6 8–6 6–4
USA
 American Men's Singles Championship – Henry Slocum (USA) defeats Quincy Shaw (USA) 6–3 6–1 4–6 6–2
 American Women's Singles Championship – Bertha Townsend (USA) defeats Lida Voorhees (USA) 7–5 6–2

References

 
Sports by year